Thompson Mountain is a mountain in Antarctica, 2,350 m, standing 5 nautical miles (9 km) south of Mount McKerrow in the southwest part of Surveyors Range. Named by the New Zealand Geological Survey Antarctic Expedition (NZGSAE) (1960–61) for Edgar H. Thompson, Professor of Surveying and Photogrammetry at the University College of London, England.

Mountains of Oates Land